Post Hill Press, distributed by Simon & Schuster, is a small United States print and e-book publishing house that focuses on publishing "conservative politics" and Christian titles. The company was founded in 2013, and has offices in New York City and Nashville, Tennessee. In 2017, the company added the Bombardier Books division for conservative politics and military books. In August 2020, they also announced a new imprint, Emancipation Books, to "give a voice to black and minority authors--including conservatives, libertarians, traditional liberals, and iconoclasts--whose nonconforming views are seldom represented in mainstream media, and find themselves increasingly unwelcome at the larger publishing houses."

Authors published by Post Hill include media personalities, political figures, motivational speakers and commentators such as Dan Bongino, Mel Robbins, K. T. McFarland, Adam Carolla, Ashley Black (creator of Ashley Black's FasciaBlaster), Ramani Durvasula, Robert Woodson, Oliver North, Reggie Williams, Teen Mom stars Maci Bookout, Leah Messer, Amber Portwood, Catelynn Lowell, and Kailyn Lowry,  Venezuelan actress and fashion model Patricia Velasquez, former presidential candidate Herman Cain, former Los Angeles Mayor Richard Riordan, and Dancing With the Stars dancer Karina Smirnoff. In 2021, it was reported that the press was going to publish a book by the police officer who shot Breonna Taylor; Simon & Schuster said it would refuse to distribute the book.

Post Hill's publisher is Anthony Ziccardi, formerly publisher of Humanix Books (a division of Newsmax Media) and associate publisher of Simon & Schuster's Gallery imprint.

In March 2019, Post Hill acquired Fidelis Books from LifeWay Christian Resources.

References

External links 
 

Book publishing companies based in New York (state)
2014 establishments in New York City
2014 establishments in Tennessee
Publishing companies established in 2014